War Child International is a network of three independent non-governmental organisations: War Child UK, War Child Holland, and War Child Canada, each legally, operationally, and financially independent but sharing a common brand identity and mission to support children and young people affected by armed conflict and war. They work with parents, caregivers, community members, NGOs, governments, corporations, and other partners worldwide to ensure children have access to protection, education and psychosocial support. War Child has its work rooted in the United Nations Convention on the Rights of the Child.

History 
War Child was established by film-makers Bill Leeson, David Wilson, and social entrepreneur and peace activist Willemijn Verloop in response to violence and ethnic cleansing they witnessed in war-torn former Yugoslavia in 1993, in the midst of the Bosnian War. The trio were deeply shocked by the children’s experiences of conflict but were inspired by the positive impact music therapy workshops run by Music Therapy professor Nigel Osborne in air raid shelters in Mostar and Sarajevo were having on the children’s well-being. In 1993, the first convoy with equipment and food to run a mobile bakery travelled to former Yugoslavia.

After leaving Bosnia, Leeson and Wilson went on to establish War Child UK in 1994 and Verloop returned to the Netherlands where she organised fundraising events in support of children in conflict zones, setting up Stichting War Child (known as War Child Holland) on 9 October 1995. The organisation grew rapidly and within three years was present in Sudan, Ingushetia, and Pakistan. The organization attributes access to businesses and ambassadors to its growth over the course of a ten-year marketing strategy.

War Child Canada was established several years later in 1999 with an affiliated War Child USA. In 2002, War Child UK established War Child Australia and War Child Ireland in 2003. Most recently, War Child Holland set up War Child Sweden in 2016 and War Child Germany in 2019.

War Child Holland

See also War Child (organisatie)

War Child Holland works on strengthening the resilience and well-being of children living with violence and armed conflict, acting in partnership with children and their communities to deliver interventions. Its specific focus is providing relevant mental health and psychosocial support, protection and education, as well as rapid assistance in emergency situations.

It is made up of three entities: War Child Netherlands,  War Child Sweden (established 2016) and War Child Germany (established 2019). Its work is supported by 487 national and international staff as well as volunteers and advocates. The organization works in 16 countries, including:

 Middle East: Lebanon, Syria, the Occupied Palestinian territory, Jordan, 
 Africa: Sudan, South Sudan, Chad, Burundi, Democratic Republic of Congo, Uganda
 Asia:   Bangladesh, Sri Lanka 
 Latin America: Colombia
 Europe: The Netherlands, Germany, Sweden

In the Middle East it provides children from both refugee and marginalised host communities with vital education and psychosocial support. In Africa, its work is intended to help children cope with the immediate and long-term consequences of conflict and build life skills. In Latin America, it promotes conflict resolution and boosting wellbeing and resilience of local children.

In 2021, War Child Holland raised €50.3 million in funds and was financially supported by 51 institutions and foundations and 95,000 structural donors. The organisation works with an estimated 164 partner organisations to implement its projects, helping it meet the needs of 48,477 children and adults (2021). It has 5,556 full time members of staff . 
Because of the large numbers of children in war and conflict, War Child Holland seeks to offer its methods to other organisations. It is currently building a global network to share knowledge with partners around the world in efforts to giving as many children as possible the right support. Can't Wait to Learn, one of its flagship projects, is being carried out in collaboration with partners around the world since 2015. This is an educational programme in which children receive an education using tablets. With the help of educational games, children are given the ability to catch up with school lessons and learn basic skills such as reading and counting. In 2019, War Child received a prize from UNESCO for its education programme.

A number of high profile goodwill ambassadors support War Child Holland’s work. These include Sierra Leonean-American ballet dancer and soloist with the Boston Ballet, Michaela DePrince (since 2016); striker for Arsenal (Women’s team) and the Netherlands women’s national football team Vivianne Miedema (since 2019); Dutch indie pop band Chef'Special (since November 2020); YouTuber, social media influencer and presenter Quinty Misiedjan (since 2016); Dutch actor, screenwriter, director and presenter, Victor Reinier (since 2016). Others include Tooske Ragas (since 2016); Britt Scholte (since 2016); Rens Polman (since 2016) and Niels Oosthoek (since 2016). Between 1998 and 2021, Dutch singer and superstar Marco Barsato was one of the organisation's goodwill ambassadors. War Child Holland's 'Famous Friends' are Dutch DJ and record producer Martin Garrix (since 2017) and Dutch Moroccan rapper and entertainer Ali B (since 2003).

In 2015, War Child Holland launched its own research and development programme which critically evaluates War Child's methods, substantiates them scientifically, and shares them with other organisations. In this way, War Child believes more children can be reached ("upscaling").

War Child Holland's Chief Executive Officer (CEO) is Ramin Shahzamani.

War Child Sweden 
War Child Sweden is officially registered as a Swedish fundraising foundation - and in 2018 became a new member of the War Child family, implementing its own programmes. The year saw the launch of two programmes to meet the needs of refugee children in Sweden - ‘Together’ and ‘Naturkraft’ - with financial support from automotive giant Scania and leading sports organisation Friskis & Svettis. It has developed close links with key government and civil society actors such as the Swedish National Development Cooperation Agency (Sida) and the Swedish Ministry of Foreign Affairs.

War Child Germany 
War Child Germany is the latest member of the War Child Holland family, officially registered as a separate limited liability company in Germany (Gesellschaft mit beschränkter Haftung, GmbH) in 2019. The office opens up access to significant new sources of funding, with the goal to reach even more people and thus helping even more children. It has an expert relationship with German government and civil society bodies.

War Child Canada

Founded by medical doctors Samantha Nutt and Eric Hoskins in 1999, War Child Canada has active partnerships in Darfur, the Democratic Republic of Congo, Uganda, South Sudan, Afghanistan, and with Syrian refugees in Jordan.

Samantha Nutt founded War Child Canada after working as a young doctor with children facing the violence and despair of war. She saw how long it takes for communities to recover from conflict after the guns fall silent. For twenty years, the organisation has advocated for children and families in war-torn areas around the world.

War Child USA

War Child USA is the newest member of the War Child family. It supports the programmes managed by War Child Canada in its countries of operation by making grants to it. War Child USA currently has offices in Los Angeles and New York City.

War Child UK

War Child UK claims to support and rehabilitate child victims of war, by working with local communities, their organisations and local authorities in both conflict and post-conflict areas to support children and the people they depend upon. War Child UK currently works in Democratic Republic of Congo, Central African Republic, Uganda, Afghanistan, Iraq and with Syrian refugees in Jordan.

War Child UK stars, media, and music

During the war in the Balkan, War Child worked together with the media, music and entertainment industries to raise funds and public awareness of the daily struggle for survival facing children in war zones. Artists including Brian Eno, David Bowie, Bono, Luciano Pavarotti, and Tom Stoppard backed the War Child UK cause at the start-up of the organisation. In 1995, the record-breaking release of The Help Album made it possible for War Child UK to start major projects in the former Yugoslavia. Since 1993, artists including Paul McCartney, Paul Weller, Oasis and Radiohead have joined the War Child cause.	

In 2005, to mark the 10th anniversary of The Help Album, War Child UK launched Help!: A Day in the Life. In addition to Radiohead and Manic Street Preachers, the new album featured artists such as Coldplay, Bloc Party, Gorillaz, Elbow, and Kaiser Chiefs, along with Keane who are current patrons of War Child UK. Another album, Heroes, was released in February 2009.

In 2008 War Child helped realise the film "The Silent Army" which was an initiative of War Child Holland ambassador Marco Borsato. The film attracted a lot of attention in the Netherlands and was selected for the 'Un Certain Regard' section of the Cannes film festival in 2009. On February 18, 2013, English alternative rock band Muse performed live, to a sold out crowd, at the O2 Shepherd's Bush Empire in honour of War Child's 20th year of existence.

The video game This War of Mine was released on November 14, 2014, by 11 bit studios in partnership with War Child as part of the "Real War is Not a Game" campaign. The goal of the campaign is to halt the perpetuation of war crimes, such as hostage taking or other breaches of the Geneva Conventions, in video games. On March 9, 2015, downloadable content for the game was released on Steam, titled "War Child Charity DLC", the proceeds of which were donated to War Child. A bundle of 12 games called HELP: THE GAME, also available on Steam, donates all of its proceeds to War Child as well. Released on July 28, 2016, this bundle is the result of various well-known game developers taking part in a 6-day-long game jam. Creative Assembly said it would donate 25 percent of pre-order profit from Total War Saga: Thrones of Britannia sales on Steam.

In 2018 Lady Amelia Windsor donated twenty percent of the proceeds from her shoe line collaboration with Penelope Chilvers to War Child UK.

On December 4, 2020, Arctic Monkeys released a live album, Live at the Royal Albert Hall, with all sales from the album being donated to War Child UK. The original concert, in 2018, was also a fundraiser, with all money from tickets sold being donated to War Child UK.

War Child UK Programmes
Starting off with mobile bakeries from the UK and with both rebuilding and music programmes from Holland, War Child UK projects expanded rapidly during the years. War Child expanded programmes within the Balkan to other countries and regions, like Kosovo. In 1995, War Child UK was undertaking the establishment of a children's music centre in Mostar, later to be called the Pavarotti Music Centre. War Child Holland actively supporting the Music Therapy Programme in Bosnia, a direction they would later specialise in, using creative and psychosocial means to heal traumas of war. From 1995, the War Child Diabetic Programme restored the diabetic support system in Bosnia; and until 1998 War Child UK remained one of the main suppliers of diabetic medicines throughout Bosnia and Herzegovina.

War Child UK Celebrity Patrons
War Child has historically been supported and endorsed by numerous influential patrons. However, it lost support from Luciano Pavarotti, Brian Eno, and three other celebrity patrons, along with 11 trustees, after it was discovered that in 1995 co-founder Bill Leeson took a bribe from contractors building a music centre in Bosnia. In 2001 when the story broke, War Child said that any financial mismanagement in the charity occurred "years ago" and they are "dealing properly with these historical charges".  The UK Charity watchdog, the Charity Commission for England and Wales stated that they had been involved with the trustees regarding the matter since 1998.  Bill Leeson is now a director at GardenAfrica, a charity he co-founded in 2002.

War Child Australia 
War Child Australia was established in July 2002. Since that time, it has been committed to providing aid to young victims of war all around the world. Historically, funds have been primarily obtained through royalties paid from publications produced by War Child including the anthologies ‘Big Night Out’, ‘Girls' Night In’ (Volumes 1-3) and ‘Kids Night In’ (Volumes 1 and 2). These publications have had the dual purpose of raising funds to be used in field work and raising public awareness of the plight of children in war zones.

References

External links 

 War Child Website

Organizations established in 1993
Organizations for children affected by war
International charities
Educational psychology organizations
Children's charities based in England
Psychology organisations based in the United Kingdom